Lucjan Roman Lis (8 August 1950 – 26 January 2015) was a Polish cyclist. He had his greatest success in the 100 km  team time trial. In this event he won a silver medal at the 1972 Summer Olympics as well as a bronze and a gold medal at the world championships in 1971 and 1973, respectively. He was less successful in the individual road race, finishing in 36th place at the 1972 Olympics. In 1973 he won the Tour de Pologne individually and the Peace Race with the Polish team.

Lis grew up in a small neighborhood in the coal mining city of Bytom and had a degree in mining. He started training in cycling following his elder brother Marian. In 1971 he had a serious injury of the achilles tendon that almost ended his career, but he recovered. He retired from competitions in 1975 and later had serious kidney problems. He married Barbara Lis, a nurse. They have two daughters, Laura and Romana, and a son Lucas, a competitive German cyclist. They lived together in Germany. Lis died of a ruptured aorta on January 26, 2015, at the age of 64.

References

External links

1950 births
2015 deaths
Cyclists at the 1972 Summer Olympics
Olympic cyclists of Poland
Polish male cyclists
Olympic silver medalists for Poland
Olympic medalists in cycling
Sportspeople from Bytom
Medalists at the 1972 Summer Olympics
UCI Road World Champions (elite men)
Cycling coaches